Petree is a surname. It may refer to:

 Andy Petree, former NASCAR crew chief & current newscaster
 Gregori Chad Petree (born 1978), American musician
 Keats Petree (1919–1997), American illustrative artist
 Nick Petree, minor league pitcher for the Missouri State Bears

See also 
 Petrey (surname)